Chelation  is a type of bonding of ions and molecules to metal ions. It involves the formation or presence of two or more separate coordinate bonds between a polydentate (multiple bonded) ligand and a single central metal atom.  These ligands are called chelants, chelators, chelating agents, or sequestering agents.  They are usually organic compounds, but this is not a necessity, as in the case of zinc and its use as a maintenance therapy to prevent the absorption of copper in people with Wilson's disease.

Chelation is useful in applications such as providing nutritional supplements, in chelation therapy to remove toxic metals from the body, as contrast agents in MRI scanning, in manufacturing using homogeneous catalysts, in chemical water treatment to assist in the removal of metals, and in fertilizers.

Chelate effect 

The chelate effect is the greater affinity of chelating ligands for a metal ion than that of similar nonchelating  (monodentate) ligands for the same metal.

The thermodynamic principles underpinning the chelate effect are illustrated by the contrasting affinities of copper(II) for ethylenediamine (en) vs. methylamine.

In the ethylenediamine forms a chelate complex with the copper ion. Chelation results in the formation of a five-membered CuC2N2 ring. In the bidentate ligand is replaced by two monodentate methylamine ligands of approximately the same donor power, indicating that the Cu–N bonds are approximately the same in the two reactions.

The thermodynamic approach to describing the chelate effect considers the equilibrium constant for the reaction: the larger the equilibrium constant, the higher the concentration of the complex.

Electrical charges have been omitted for simplicity of notation. The square brackets indicate concentration, and the subscripts to the stability constants, β, indicate the stoichiometry of the complex. When the analytical concentration of methylamine is twice that of ethylenediamine and the concentration of copper is the same in both reactions, the concentration [Cu(en)] is much higher than the concentration [Cu(MeNH2)2] because β11 ≫ β12.

An equilibrium constant, K, is related to the standard Gibbs free energy,  by

Since the enthalpy should be approximately the same for the two reactions, the difference between the two stability constants is due to the effects of entropy. In equation there are two particles on the left and one on the right, whereas in equation there are three particles on the left and one on the right. This difference means that less entropy of disorder is lost when the chelate complex is formed with bidentate ligand than when the complex with monodentate ligands is formed. This is one of the factors contributing to the entropy difference. Other factors include solvation changes and ring formation. Some experimental data to illustrate the effect are shown in the following table.
{| class="wikitable"
! Equilibrium !! log β !!  !!  !! 
|-
| Cu2+ + 2 MeNH2  Cu(MeNH2)22+
||6.55|| −37.4 || −57.3||19.9
|-
| Cu2+ + en  Cu(en)2+
||10.62|| −60.67 || −56.48||−4.19
|}
These data confirm that the enthalpy changes are approximately equal for the two reactions and that the main reason for the greater stability of the chelate complex is the entropy term, which is much less unfavorable. In general it is difficult to account precisely for thermodynamic values in terms of changes in solution at the molecular level, but it is clear that the chelate effect is predominantly an effect of entropy.

Other explanations, including that of Schwarzenbach, are discussed in Greenwood and Earnshaw (loc.cit).

In nature
Numerous biomolecules exhibit the ability to dissolve certain metal cations. Thus, proteins, polysaccharides, and polynucleic acids are excellent polydentate ligands for many metal ions.  Organic compounds such as the amino acids glutamic acid and histidine, organic diacids such as malate, and polypeptides such as phytochelatin are also typical chelators. In addition to these adventitious chelators, several biomolecules are specifically produced to bind certain metals (see next section).

In biochemistry and microbiology 
Virtually all metalloenzymes feature metals that are chelated, usually to peptides or cofactors and prosthetic groups.  Such chelating agents include the porphyrin rings in hemoglobin and chlorophyll.  Many microbial species produce water-soluble pigments that serve as chelating agents, termed siderophores. For example,  species of Pseudomonas are known to secrete pyochelin and pyoverdine that bind iron. Enterobactin, produced by E. coli, is the strongest chelating agent known. The marine mussels use metal chelation esp. Fe3+ chelation with the Dopa residues in mussel foot protein-1 to improve the strength of the threads that they use to secure themselves to surfaces.

In geology 
In earth science, chemical weathering is attributed to organic chelating agents (e.g., peptides and sugars) that extract metal ions from minerals and rocks.  Most metal complexes in the environment and in nature are bound in some form of chelate ring (e.g., with a humic acid or a protein). Thus, metal chelates are relevant to the mobilization of metals in the soil, the uptake and the accumulation of metals into plants and microorganisms. Selective chelation of heavy metals is relevant to bioremediation (e.g., removal of 137Cs from radioactive waste).

Medical applications

Nutritional supplements
In the 1960s, scientists developed the concept of chelating a metal ion prior to feeding the element to the animal. They believed that this would create a neutral compound, protecting the mineral from being complexed with insoluble salts within the stomach, which would render the metal unavailable for absorption.  Amino acids, being effective metal binders, were chosen as the prospective ligands, and research was conducted on the metal–amino acid combinations. The research supported that the metal–amino acid chelates were able to enhance mineral absorption.

During this period, synthetic chelates such as ethylenediaminetetraacetic acid (EDTA) were being developed. These applied the same concept of chelation and did create chelated compounds; but these synthetics were too stable and not nutritionally viable. If the mineral was taken from the EDTA ligand, the ligand could not be used by the body and would be expelled. During the expulsion process the EDTA ligand randomly chelated and stripped another mineral from the body.

According to the Association of American Feed Control Officials (AAFCO), a metal–amino acid chelate is defined as the product resulting from the reaction of metal ions from a soluble metal salt with amino acids, with a mole ratio in the range of 1–3 (preferably 2) moles of amino acids for one mole of metal. The average weight of the hydrolyzed amino acids must be approximately 150 and the resulting molecular weight of the chelate must not exceed 800 Da.

Since the early development of these compounds, much more research has been conducted, and has been applied to human nutrition products in a similar manner to the animal nutrition experiments that pioneered the technology. Ferrous bis-glycinate is an example of one of these compounds that has been developed for human nutrition.

Dental and oral application
Dentin adhesives were first designed and produced in the 1950s based on a co-monomer chelate with calcium on the surface of the tooth and generated very weak water-resistant chemical bonding (2–3 MPa).

Heavy-metal detoxification

Chelation therapy is an antidote for poisoning by mercury, arsenic, and lead.  Chelating agents convert these metal ions into a chemically and biochemically inert form that can be excreted. Chelation using calcium disodium EDTA has been approved by the U.S. Food and Drug Administration (FDA) for serious cases of lead poisoning. It is not approved for treating "heavy metal toxicity".

Although beneficial in cases of serious lead poisoning, use of disodium EDTA (edetate disodium) instead of calcium disodium EDTA has resulted in fatalities due to hypocalcemia. Disodium EDTA is not approved by the FDA for any use, and all FDA-approved chelation therapy products require a prescription.

Pharmaceuticals
Chelate complexes of gadolinium are often used as contrast agents in MRI scans, although iron particle and manganese chelate complexes have also been explored. Bifunctional chelate complexes of zirconium, gallium, fluorine, copper, yttrium, bromine, or iodine are often used for conjugation to monoclonal antibodies for use in antibody-based PET imaging. These chelate complexes often employ the usage of hexadentate ligands such as desferrioxamine B (DFO), according to Meijs et al., and the gadolinium complexes often employ the usage of octadentate ligands such as DTPA, according to Desreux et al. Auranofin, a chelate complex of gold, is used in the treatment of rheumatoid arthritis, and penicillamine, which forms chelate complexes of copper, is used in the treatment of Wilson's disease and cystinuria, as well as refractory rheumatoid arthritis.

Other medical applications
Chelation in the intestinal tract is a cause of numerous interactions between drugs and metal ions (also known as "minerals" in nutrition). As examples, antibiotic drugs of the tetracycline and quinolone families are chelators of Fe2+, Ca2+, and Mg2+ ions.

EDTA, which binds to calcium, is used to alleviate the hypercalcemia that often results from band keratopathy.  The calcium may then be removed from the cornea, allowing for some increase in clarity of vision for the patient.

Industrial and agricultural applications

Catalysis
Homogeneous catalysts are often chelated complexes. A representative example is the use of BINAP (a bidentate phosphine) in Noyori asymmetric hydrogenation and asymmetric isomerization. The latter has the practical use of manufacture of synthetic (–)-menthol.

Water softening
Citric acid is used to soften water in soaps and laundry detergents. A common synthetic chelator is EDTA. Phosphonates are also well-known chelating agents. Chelators are used in water treatment programs and specifically in steam engineering, e.g., boiler water treatment system: Chelant Water Treatment system.  Although the treatment is often referred to as "softening," chelation has little effect on the water's mineral content, other than to make it soluble and lower the water's pH level.

Fertilizers
Metal chelate compounds are common components of fertilizers to provide micronutrients.  These micronutrients (manganese, iron, zinc, copper) are required for the health of the plants.  Most fertilizers contain phosphate salts that, in the absence of chelating agents, typically convert these metal ions into insoluble solids that are of no nutritional value to the plants.  EDTA is the typical chelating agent that keeps these metal ions in a soluble form.

Dechelation 

Dechelation (or de-chelation) is a reverse process of the chelation in which the chelating agent is recovered by acidifying solution with a mineral acid to form a precipitate.

Etymology
The word chelation is derived from Greek χηλή, chēlē, meaning "claw"; the ligands lie around the central atom like the claws of a lobster. The term chelate was first applied in 1920 by Sir Gilbert T. Morgan and H. D. K. Drew, who stated: "The adjective chelate, derived from the great claw or chele (Greek) of the lobster or other crustaceans, is suggested for the caliperlike groups which function as two associating units and fasten to the central atom so as to produce heterocyclic rings."

See also

References

External links 
 

 
Coordination chemistry
Equilibrium chemistry